Southeast Sulawesi is a province on the island of Sulawesi, forming the southeastern peninsula of that island, together with a number of substantial offshore islands such as Buton, Muna, Kabaena and Wawonii (formerly called Wowoni), together with many smaller islands. The capital is the city of Kendari, on the east coast of the peninsula.

The province has no highway road connecting to the rest of the island, and the primary transportation link is a ferry across the Bone Gulf between Watampone (Bone) in South Sulawesi and the port of Kolaka in Southeast Sulawesi.

History

Geography

The two major mountain ranges in Southeast Sulawesi are the Tanggeasinua Range and the Mekongga Range. The major rivers are the Lalinda, the Lasolo, and the Sampara.

Demographics
The population of the province was 2,232,586 at the 2010 decennial census (1,120,225 males, and 1,110,344 females), increasing to 2,624,875 at the 2020 Census. The official estimate as at mid 2022 was 2,701,661. Konawe Selatan, Konawe, Kolaka and Muna are the four most populous regencies. Islam is the predominant religion (96,2%).

A third of the population is centered on Buton and Muna islands off the south coast of Sulawesi, and another 15% live in and around Kendari.

Religion

According to the 2021 estimates, 2,560,000 peoples are Muslims, 50,780 are Hindus, 44,870 are Protestants, 16,180 are Roman Catholics, 1,610 are Buddhists, 113 are Confusians and 63 adhere to Folk religions.

Ethnic groups
The main ethnic groups in Southeast Sulawesi are "Tolaki", "Buton", "Muna" etc.

Administrative divisions
Southeast Sulawesi Province is divided into fifteen regencies (including the five new residencies established in 2013 and 2014) and two autonomous cities.

As at 1995, there were just four regencies within the province - Buton, Kolaka, Konawe and Muna. On 3 August, the city of Kendari was created from part of Konawe Regency, and on 21 June 2001 the city of Bau-Bau was created from part of Buton Regency.

On 25 February 2003, South Konawe Regency was created from part of Konawe Regency. On 18 December 2003, three new regencies were created - Bombana Regency and Wakatobi Regency from parts of Buton Regency, and North Kolaka Regency from part of Kolaka Regency. On 2 January 2007, two new regencies were created - North Konawe Regency from part of Konawe Regency, and North Buton Regency from part of Muna Regency

In 2013 the Indonesian Government enacted the creation of 11 new Regencies and Municipalities, including the following in Southeast Sulawesi:

 Konawe Islands Regency, from part of Konawe Regency (enacted by Act No.8 of 2013, on 11 January 2013)
 East Kolaka Regency, from part of Konawe Regency (enacted by Act No.11 of 2013, on 11 May 2013)

Subsequently, on 24 June 2014, the Indonesian Parliament agreed to create three more new regencies, based on consideration of technical, administrative, area, strategic and geopolitic factors.

 South Buton Regency, from part of Buton Regency (enacted by Act No.16 of 2014, on 23 July 2014)
 Central Buton Regency, from part of Buton Regency (enacted by Act No.16 of 2014, on 23 July 2014)
 West Muna Regency, from part of Muna Regency (enacted by Act No.16 of 2014, on 23 July 2014)

These regencies and cities are tabulated below, with their areas and their populations at the 2010 Census and the 2020 Census, together with the official estimates as at mid 2022. The table also includes the location of the regency/city headquarters and their Human Development Index.

Notes: (a) Bombana Regency is partly peninsula (the areas around Poleang and Rumbia on Sulawesi Island) and partly insular (including most of Kabaena Island). (b) The Central Buton Regency comprises the southern part of Muna Island and a small southern part of Kabaena Island, but does not include any part of Buton Island. (c) Under discussion is a proposal to create an additional municipality of Raha, on Muna Island. This potential extra municipality, is not separated in the table above. (d) The Konawe Islands Regency comprises Wawonii Island and small offshore islets.

Transportation

Airports
 Betoambari Airport, Baubau
 Haluoleo Airport, South Konawe
 Matahora Airport, Wakatobi
 Sangia Nibandera Airport, Kolaka
 Sugimanuru Airport, West Muna
 Tomia Airport, Wakatobi

Ports
 Antam Pomalaa, Kolaka
 Bungkutoko, Kendari
 Ferry (ASDP), Kolaka
 Ferry Batulo, Baubau
 Ferry Lagasa, Muna
 Ferry Pure, Muna
 Ferry Tampo, Muna
 Ferry Tondasi, West Muna
 Ferry Wamengkoli, Central Buton
 Liana Banggai, Central Buton
 Maligano, Muna
 Murhum, Baubau
 Nusantara, Kendari
 Nusantara Raha, Muna
 Pangulu Belo, Wakatobi
 Samudra, Kolaka
 Simpu, South Buton
 Transito Talaga Raya, Central Buton

See also

Wakatobi National Park

References

External links
Official website

 
States and territories established in 1964
Provinces of Indonesia
Southeast